(On the Art of Dice) is the name of a now-lost book written by the fourth Roman emperor Claudius. As the name suggests, it details how to play the game of dice.

History

In book five, chapter 33 of the work  by Roman historian Suetonius (c. AD 69122), the author discusses many of Roman Emperor Claudius's vices. The final one considered was the leader's love of dice. Suetonius notes, "[Claudius] played dice most avidly, on the art of which he also wrote a book".

Mention of this work is only to be found in Suetonius's work. The title  seems to be mostly speculative, and based merely on the assertion by Suetonius that the book was "on the art of [dice]".

While it seems reasonable to conclude that the book concerned dice, exactly what was included in the book is a mystery, as the work has been lost. Austin notes that it is very possible that the work may have dealt with a newer form of the game.

References

Bibliography

 
 
 

Claudius
Lost books
Dice
1st-century books
Books about games